Donald George Halliday (born 16 June 1947 in Perth, Scotland) is a Scottish former sprinter who competed in the 100 metres at the 1972 Summer Olympics.

He won the Scottish Championships 100 on 3 occasions, as well as the Scottish Championship 200m in 1974.

He also was AAA indoor 60 metres title champion twice, 1971 and 1974.

Don also won the AAA 100metres championship in 1973.

He represented Scotland at the 1970 and 1974 British Commonwealth Games.

References

1947 births
Living people
Olympic athletes of Great Britain
Athletes (track and field) at the 1972 Summer Olympics
Commonwealth Games competitors for Scotland
Athletes (track and field) at the 1970 British Commonwealth Games
Athletes (track and field) at the 1974 British Commonwealth Games
British male sprinters
Sportspeople from Perth, Scotland
Scottish male sprinters